JHC Avto is a junior ice hockey team from Yekaterinburg, which contains players from the Avtomobilist Yekaterinburg school. They are members of the Junior Hockey League (MHL), the top tier of junior hockey in the country.

External links 
Official Page

2009 establishments in Russia
Avtomobilist Yekaterinburg
Ice hockey clubs established in 2009
Ice hockey teams in Russia
Junior Hockey League (Russia) teams